Qulan (also Romanized as Qūlān; also known as Ghoolan, Kulan, and Qolān) is a village in Nowjeh Mehr Rural District, Siah Rud District, Jolfa County, East Azerbaijan Province, Iran.  At the 2006 census, its population was 491, in 105 families.

See also

References 

Populated places in Jolfa County